Manuel Antonio Mesones Muro District is one of six districts of the province Ferreñafe in Peru.

References

See also
 Manuel Antonio Mesones Muro